Thomas Neill (born 9 June 2002) is an Australian swimmer. He competed in the men's 200 metre freestyle at the 2020 Summer Olympics.

References

External links
 

2002 births
Living people
Australian male freestyle swimmers
Place of birth missing (living people)
Olympic swimmers of Australia
Swimmers at the 2020 Summer Olympics
Medalists at the 2020 Summer Olympics
Olympic bronze medalists for Australia
Olympic bronze medalists in swimming
Medalists at the FINA World Swimming Championships (25 m)
21st-century Australian people